Bedingham Green is a hamlet in Norfolk, England.

References

Hamlets in Norfolk
South Norfolk